Ambanpola is a town in Kurunegala District in Sri Lanka. Ambanpola is located between Maho and Galgamuwa towns. It is also a major railway station on the Northern Line. There are several public places like temples, police stations, schools are in this town. When traveling from Kurunegala to Anuradhapura via Padeniya this town can be found from 57 km away from Kurunegala town when travelling along "Anuradhapura through Alla" (route number is 57). Wide range of people are living in Ambanoola with various religious, social, cultural back grounds.  Still the majority of the people are farmers and there are businessmen and government officers live in there.  Famous reservoirs of beautiful Abakolawewa,  Athaeagalla and inginimitiya are located around Ambanpola.

Well-known government Ayurvedic hospital is in Ambanpola and it is located in Danikithawa road,  just 200m form the main junction

References

Populated places in North Western Province, Sri Lanka